The lime-speck pug (Eupithecia centaureata) is a moth of the family Geometridae. It is a common species throughout the Palearctic region (where it is found in Europe, Central Asia, Mongolia, southern Siberia, eastern China (Guangdong) and Taiwan), the Near East and North Africa.

Description
This is a distinctive species, all the wings being largely white except for a black blotch on the costa of the forewing. The wingspan is 20–24 mm. In the ab. obscura Dietze.(perhaps developed chiefly in Asia but also recorded from the Tyrol) the ground-colour of both wings has a smoky suffusion. In the ab. centralisata Stgr., chiefly from Palestine and Central Asia, the markings are weaker, sometimes (except the discal mark) almost entirely obsolete.  The larva is long and thin, white-yellow with a red dorsal stripe and horseshoe-shaped red spots running down the sides.

Often two broods are produced each year and the adults can be seen at any time during the summer and autumn. The moths fly at night and are attracted to light and nectar-rich flowers.

The larva is rather variable but is usually green or yellow, often with red markings. It feeds on the flowers of a variety of plants (see list below). The species overwinters as a pupa.

Larval food plants

Achillea – yarrow
Angelica
Arctium – burdock
Artemisia
Calluna – heather
Campanula
Centaurea
Cirsium – thistle
Crambe
Filipendula – meadowsweet
Galium – bedstraw
Hieracium – hawkweed
Lotus – bird's-foot trefoil
Lysimachia – yellow loosestrife
Matricaria – mayweed
Medicago – alfalfa
Pimpinella – burnet saxifrage
Rumex – sorrel
Selinum – milk-parsley
Silene – bladder campion
Solidago – goldenrod
Tanacetum – tansy
Trifolium – red clover
Vicia – tufted vetch

References

 Chinery, Michael. Collins Guide to the Insects of Britain and Western Europe (1986, reprinted 1991)
 Skinner, Bernard. Colour Identification Guide to Moths of the British Isles (1984)

External links
 
 
 Lepiforum.de

Eupithecia
Moths described in 1775
Moths of Africa
Moths of Asia
Moths of Europe
Taxa named by Michael Denis
Taxa named by Ignaz Schiffermüller